Green is a city in southeastern Summit County, Ohio, United States. The population was 27,475 at the 2020 census. It is a suburban community between Akron and Canton and is part of the Akron metropolitan area.

History
Green Township was first created in 1809 as part of Stark County. Green Township became part of Summit County after that county's establishment in 1840. Green had several unincorporated hamlets, most notably Greensburg. By 1900, five unincorporated settlements were in Green Township, surrounded by farmlands with valuable crops and areas of coal. The local economy transitioned from farming to business and manufacturing. By 1950, farmers began to sell their lands to developers for residential housing. The increased development in the community led to discussions about becoming a city. Voters approved the merger of the village with the rest of the township in 1991. In the beginning of 1991, Green Township was incorporated as the Village of Green. The village was declared a city in 1992, with the first city mayor being John Torok.

The City of Green is also notable for its legal battle against the NEXUS Pipeline, which runs dangerously close to residential neighborhoods, endangered wetlands, and the Comet Lake Dam. Construction began in 2018 after a settlement of $7.5 million was reached with the city's government.

Post office
The city has no unique postal ZIP code. It is served by the Green post office, but only post office boxes are served by this ZIP code (44232). No street addresses in Green have this ZIP code, Green street addresses are served by 5 different post offices:
 Two Akron post offices (ZIP codes 44312, 44319)
 One North Canton post office (44720)
 Clinton (44216) post office
 Uniontown post office (44685)

Geography
Green is at  (40.956719, -81.481218).

Demographics

2010 census
As of the census of 2010, there were 25,699 people, 10,070 households, and 7,217 families residing in the city. The racial makeup of the city was 95.0% White, 1.8% African American, 0.2% Native American, 1.5% Asian, 0.2% from other races, and 1.2% from two or more races. Hispanic or Latino of any race were 1.2% of the population.

There were 10,070 households, of which 33.5% had children under the age of 18 living with them, 57.5% were married couples living together, 10.0% had a female householder with no husband present, 4.3% had a male householder with no wife present, and 28.3% were non-families. 23.9% of all households were made up of individuals, and 9.9% had someone living alone who was 65 years of age or older. The average household size was 2.54 and the average family size was 3.02.

The median age in the city was 41.8 years. 24.1% of residents were under the age of 18; 7.6% were between the ages of 18 and 24; 23.1% were from 25 to 44; 30.7% were from 45 to 64; and 14.5% were 65 years of age or older. The gender makeup of the city was 48.7% male and 51.3% female.

2000 census
As of the census of 2000, there were 22,817 people, 8,742 households, and 6,425 families residing in the city. The population density was 711.7 people per square mile (274.8/km2). There were 9,180 housing units at an average density of 286.3 per square mile (110.6/km2). The racial makeup of the city was 97.52% White, 0.72% African American, 0.15% Native American, 0.78% Asian, 0.02% Pacific Islander, 0.12% from other races, and 0.69% from two or more races. Hispanic or Latino of any race were 0.49% of the population.

There were 8,742 households, out of which 34.2% had children under the age of 18 living with them, 61.3% were married couples living together, 8.9% had a female householder with no husband present, and 26.5% were non-families. 22.1% of all households were made up of individuals, and 7.9% had someone living alone who was 65 years of age or older. The average household size was 2.59 and the average family size was 3.05.

In the city, the population was spread out, with 26.1% under the age of 18, 6.7% from 18 to 24, 28.5% from 25 to 44, 26.2% from 45 to 64, and 12.6% who were 65 years of age or older. The median age was 39 years. For every 100 females, there were 97.6 males. For every 100 females age 18 and over, there were 94.0 males.

The median income for a household in the city was $54,133, and the median income for a family was $61,662. Males had a median income of $45,456 versus $28,725 for females. The per capita income for the city was $25,575. About 4.2% of families and 5.0% of the population were below the poverty line, including 7.5% of those under age 18 and 4.7% of those age 65 or over.

Government

Federally, Green is represented in the United States Senate by Ohio Senators Sherrod Brown (D) and J. D. Vance (R). They are represented in the United States House of Representatives by Congresswoman Emilia Sykes (D).

In the Ohio Senate, Green is represented by Republican Kristina Roegner. Bob Young (R) represents Green in the Ohio House of Representatives. Young is a former City Council member from Green.

The City of Green is governed by a mayor and a 7-member city council. The mayor and three members of Council are elected at-large, while four council members are elected from wards. The mayor and all council members are limited to two consecutive, four-year terms. As of 2022, the mayor is Gerard Neugebauer.

As of 2022, the members of city council are:
Barbara Babbitt (Ward 1)
C. J. Meager (Ward 2)
Rocco Yeargin (Ward 3) (President of Council)
Jeff Noble (Ward 4)
Clark Anthony DeVitis (At-large)
Dave France (At-large) (Vice President of Council)
Richard Brandenburg (At-large)

Flag of Green, Ohio
The flag of Green was created as a result of a contest targeted towards school-age residents, due to similar design there was a tie between two creators, Matt Pitzo and Justin Callahan. The motto for the city was created by Carrie West, "A township from the past, a city of the future." The flag can be viewed at Boettler Park on Massillon Road, along with the CAB (Central Administration Building), and Akron General also on Massillon Road.

Economy
Diebold Nixdorf, a world leader in products, software and services for banking and retail markets, is headquartered in Green.

Largest employers
According to Green's 2017 Comprehensive Annual Financial Report, the largest employers in the city at the time were:

Places of interest
The Akron-Canton Regional Airport is located mostly in the city of Green, although a small part extends into Jackson Township in Stark County. Singer Lake Bog is also located nearby.

Notable people
 Rachel Cargle, author
 Mark Croghan, Olympic track and field athlete
 Dick Goddard, late former meteorologist for WJW
 Heather Kozar, 1999 Playboy Playmate of the Year
 David Lough, former professional baseball player
 Mary Taylor, former Lieutenant Governor of Ohio

International relations

Green became a sister city with Beiuș, Romania in 2018.

References

External links
 Official website
 Green Local Schools

Cities in Summit County, Ohio
Populated places established in 1809
Cities in Ohio